Nizip District is a district of Gaziantep Province of Turkey. Its seat is the city of Nizip, which had 148,386 inhabitants at the end of 2022.

Settlements

Center neighborhoods 

 Atatürk
 Cumhuriyet
 Eyüp Sultan
 Fatih Sultan
 Fevkani
 Fevzipaşa
 Fırat
 Hafızpaşa
 İstasyon
 İstiklal
 Karşıyaka
 Kıbrıs
 Menderes
 Mevlana
 Mimar Sinan
 Namıkkemal
 Pazarcami
 Saha
 Sultan Abdulhamit
 Şahinbey
 Şıhlar
 Tahtani
 Yeşilevler
 Yunus Emre
 Zeytinlik

Rural neighborhoods 

 Adaklı
 Akçakent
 Akkuyu
 Alahacı
 Altındağ
 Aşağıbayındır
 Aşağıçardak
 Bağlıca
 Bahçeli
 Ballı
 Belkıs
 Boyluca
 Bozalioğlu
 Çakmaktepe
 Çanakçı
 Dayıdağı
 Dernek
 Doğrular
 Duraklı
 Dutlu
 Düzbayır
 Ekinci
 Erenköy
 Eskikonak
 Gaziler
 Gevence
 Gökçeli
 Güder
 Gülkaya
 Gümüşgün
 Günaltı
 Gürbaşak
 Güzelköy
 Hancağız
 Hazımoğlu
 İkizce
 İntepe
 Kale
 Kamışlı
 Karaburç
 Kayalar
 Keklik
 Kesiktaş
 Kıraçgülü
 Kıratlı
 Kızılcakent
 Kızılin
 Kocatepe
 Korucak
 Köseler
 Kumla
 Kurucahüyük
 Mağaracık
 Mehmetobası
 Mercanlı
 Mihrap
 Nahırtepe
 Özyurt
 Salkım
 Samandöken
 Samanlı
 Saray
 Sarıkoç
 Sekili
 Söğütlü
 Suboyu
 Tanır
 Tatlıcak
 Tosunlu
 Toydemir
 Tuluktaş
 Turlu
 Turnalı
 Uluyatır
 Yağcılar
 Yağmuralan
 Yarımtepe
 Yeniyapan
 Yeniyazı
 Yolçatı
 Yukarıbayındır
 Yukarıçardak

References

Districts of Gaziantep Province